Conor Maguire may refer to:
 Conor Maguire (judge) (1889–1971), Irish politician, lawyer and judge
 Conor Maguire (rugby union), Irish rugby union player

See also
 Connor Maguire (disambiguation)